Otago Boys' High School (OBHS) is a secondary school in Dunedin, New Zealand. It is one of New Zealand's oldest boys' secondary schools. Originally known as Dunedin High School, it was founded on 3 August 1863 and moved to its present site in 1885. The main building was designed by Robert Lawson and is regarded as one of the finest Gothic revival structures in the country. Situated on high ground above central Dunedin it commands excellent views of the city and is a prominent landmark.

Otago Girls' High School now occupies the original site in Tennyson Street, closer to the centre of the city and is Otago Boys' sister school.

The school owns a lodge in Mount Aspiring National Park, and has regular field trips for students.

Building history
The school opened on its present site in Arthur Street in 1885. The Main Tower Block was designed by R A Lawson and built for 14,800 pounds in blue stone, Port Chalmers breccia and Oamaru stone by W A Carlton. It has long been regarded as a fine design and is listed as a Category I Historic Place.

The foundation rector, Thomas Campbell, was a graduate of St John's College, Cambridge, and headmaster of Wolverhampton Grammar School. He arrived with his family in Deborah Bay on 3 July 1863, and took the steamer Pride of Yarra for Dunedin the following day. The steamer collided with the Favorite off Kilgour Point, and sank with the loss of 13 lives, among them the entire Campbell party, consisting of Thomas Campbell, his wife, five children aged 5 weeks to 5 years, and their two servants.

Two other masters were appointed at the same time as Campbell. The English master was George P. Abram, a Senior Scholar and Prizeman of Clare College, Cambridge, and Second Master of Wolverhampton Grammar School. Daniel Brent, a Senior Scholar and Prizeman of Queen's College, Cambridge, and a Mathematical master of Tonbridge School, was appointed Mathematical Master. After Mr Campbell's death, Abram filled in as principal until another appointment could be made.

The school opened 3 August 1863 with Abram as principal and a roll of 80 pupils. In May 1864, the Reverend F. C. Simmons, of Lincoln College, Oxford, and Head-master of the Dundee Proprietary School, arrived to take up the position of Rector.

Increasing roll numbers from 1903 led to the opening of the Shand Building in 1914, designed by Edmund Anscombe. He was also responsible for the Rectory, 1913, the principal's onsite residence. The Shand Building, originally called "Shand Hall" cost 3,600 pounds. The following year it was extended to a design by Harry Mandeno (1879–1972). A memorial arch at the entrance to the grounds, built in blue stone and Oamaru stone and designed by Leslie Coombs (1885–1952) was unveiled in 1923. In 1920 the Fulton Building provided six additional classrooms, but this has since been replaced with the gymnasium complex and rehoused swimming pool designed by E.J. Ted McCoy as part of the later major restoration and redevelopment of the school's buildings.

There is a teaching block, named after a former Rector, Mr. W.J. Morrell, which was erected in 1961 to a standard Ministry of Works design, though contextualised with blue stone fascias by the architect Ian R McAllum. A grandstand with similar fascias on its rearward elevation forms part of a quadrangle, with the Morrell building, behind the Lawson building. This was also designed by McAllum and built from 1962 to 1963. It has a cantilevered, multiple-gabled canopy added in 1964. Specialist science laboratories designed by Angus Black were constructed in 1967 and were named after the pioneering plastic surgeon Sir Archibald McIndoe, an Old Boy of the school. Mr D J MacLachlan, Rector from 1963 to 1985, worked tirelessly for the construction of the main teaching block which now bears his name.

This is part of the major restoration and redevelopment which saw the refurbishment of the Main Tower Block, the central feature of which is the Maurice Joel Theatre. It also involved the construction of several large new buildings, forming a new quadrangle around the former Green in the greatest expansion of the complex since the 1880s. This considerable undertaking, designed by E.J. Ted McCoy was completed in 1983.

The new buildings, though unmistakably Modernist, nevertheless sit very comfortably with the old. Where Lawson's tower block is an exemplary composition in the Scottish Baronial style, taking its inspiration from the 16th-century tower houses and reading something like a toy fort or a castle to a modern eye, McCoy's blue stone aggregate and fair face concrete echo its materials while the new complex's gun slot windows are a playful reference to the Maginot line which echoes the old building's military theme. The new buildings are also very modestly set below the old so the latter take visual pre-eminence from a distance. The project won the architect a National Award from the New Zealand Institute of Architects. It has also been pointed to as an example of his unusual ability to mix the emphatically old with the unashamedly new.

Houses
In 2012 Otago Boys' High School introduced the house system.
Every year the four houses compete in competitions to win the annual House Competition
The main events are athletics, cross country, the haka competition and a school song competition.
Smaller competitions also pop up during the year including the can drive, the car jam and other events.

 Aspinall (Yellow) - Named after John Aspinall, an old boy and donator of the Aspinall lodge used for camps
 McIndoe (Red) - Named after Sir Archibald McIndoe, an old boy and surgeon who treated and rehabilitated the Royal Air Force during World War II
 Park (Blue) - Named after Sir Keith Park, an old boy and officer of the Royal Air Force who was vital to the Luftwaffe's defeat in the Battle of Britain
 Saxton (White) - Named after Charlie Saxton, an old boy and talented sportsman

Notable alumni

See also
 List of schools in New Zealand

References

Sources
 T.J. Arnold (et al.), Centennial Publication Otago Boys' High School Old Boys' Register, Dunedin: NZ; Otago High School Old Boys' Society (Inc.), 1963.
 G.J. Griffiths, Alfred Eccles, E.J. McCoy, Otago Boys' High and its historic neighbourhood, Dunedin: NZ; Otago Heritage Books, 1983.

External links

 Official website
 OBHS Foundation website

Boarding schools in New Zealand
Boys' schools in New Zealand
Heritage New Zealand Category 1 historic places in Otago
Educational institutions established in 1863
Jacobethan architecture
Secondary schools in Dunedin
Robert Lawson buildings
Edmund Anscombe buildings
1863 establishments in New Zealand
1880s architecture in New Zealand
Harry Mandeno buildings
Central Dunedin